Birch Hills Airport  is located adjacent to Birch Hills, Saskatchewan, Canada. The airport officially opened on June 5, 1994. It is equipped with radio controlled lighting, lighted wind sock, rotating beacon, security fence, and a spray pad to accommodate spray planes.

See also
List of airports in Saskatchewan

References

External links
Page about this airport on COPA's Places to Fly airport directory

Registered aerodromes in Saskatchewan